Quincy is an unincorporated community in Greenwood County, Kansas, United States.  It is located between Eureka and Yates Center in a rural area.

History
A post office was opened in Quincy in 1869, and remained in operation until it was discontinued in 1975.

References

Further reading

External links
 Greenwood County maps: Current, Historic, KDOT

Unincorporated communities in Greenwood County, Kansas
Unincorporated communities in Kansas